Simone van der Vlugt (born 15 December 1966) is a Dutch writer, known there for her historical and young adult novels.  She has also written for younger children, and adults.  Several of her crime novels have been published in English.

Biography
Van der Vlugt (née Watertor) was born in Hoorn and started writing at an early age, submitting her first manuscript to a publisher at 13 years of age. Her first published novel (The Amulet, 1995, a historical novel about witch persecution, for children) was written while working as a secretary at a bank.  She went on to write ten further historical novels for young adults.

In 2004 Van der Vlugt wrote her first novel for adults, The Reunion, a psychological suspense thriller.  This was followed by another six standalone crime novels. In 2012 she started a series of detective stories featuring Lois Elzinga, based in Alkmaar.

Van der Vlugt lives with her husband and two children in Alkmaar.

Bibliography

Crime thrillers
 2004 De Reünie (translated as The Reunion, 2009)
 2005 Schaduwzuster (translated as Shadow Sister, 2011)
 2007 Het laatste offer (The Final Sacrifice)
 2008 Blauw water (Blue Water, translated as Safe as Houses, 2013)
 2009 Herfstlied (Autumn Song)
 2010 Op klaarlichte dag (In Broad Daylight)
 2011 In mijn dromen (In My Dreams)

Lois Elzinga detective series
 2012 Aan niemand vertellen (Tell No One)
 2013 Morgen ben ik weer thuis (Tomorrow I'll Be Back Home)
 2014 Vraag niet waarom (Don't Ask Why)

Historical novels
 2009 Jacoba, dochter van Holland (Jacoba, daughter of Holland)
 2012 Rode sneeuw in december (Red Snow in December)
2016 Bleu de Delft (Midnight Blue)
2019 Schilderslief

External links
 Official website
 Reviews of The Reunion
 Translated interview with Simone van der Vlugt

1966 births
Living people
People from Hoorn
Dutch mystery writers
Dutch writers of young adult literature
Dutch children's writers
Women mystery writers
Dutch women children's writers
Women writers of young adult literature